Sam Tata  (September 30, 1911 – July 3, 2005) was a  photographer and photojournalist.

Early life
Sam Bejan Tata was born in Shanghai, China, on September 30, 1911, to a mercantile Parsi family. He went to Shanghai Public School, and then studied business for two years at the University of Hong Kong. He took up photography at the age of twenty-four, and was one of the founding members of the Shanghai Camera Club. A friend at the club, Alex Buchman, who was working as a photojournalist for the China Press, inspired Tata to buy his first Leica and roam the streets for meaningful images. In 1939, he learned academic studio portraiture with Oscar Seepol, and he later studied with the photographers Lang Jingshan and Liu Xucang. He became adept in his early photographs with the use of lighting and the additive techniques favoured by the pictorialists. His focus on portraiture in these years was partly dictated by the Japanese occupation of Shanghai in 1937, and Tata was not able to take up photography full-time until 1946.

Bombay and Henri Cartier-Bresson
In 1947, through the efforts of the Indian pictorialist Jehangir N. Unwalla, Tata's work was shown in Bombay. Several months later, at a show sponsored by the Bombay Art Society, he met French photographer Henri Cartier-Bresson, and through his influence and mentorship, was galvanized to take up photojournalism with renewed vigour. He began to contribute to Bombay periodicals such as Trend and Flashlight. With Cartier-Bresson, Tata documented the Indian Independence movement from 1946–1948, including the assassination of Mahatma Gandhi. In 1949, Tata returned to Shanghai, where he recorded the fall of the Kuomintang and the takeover of the city by Communist troops; for a period he was accompanied by Cartier-Bresson. Tata remained in the city until 1952, when he moved to Hong Kong. In transition, many of his early photographs were seized by the Chinese censors. He made a trip to Kashmir and India in 1955, and his photo-essay, "Himalyan Pilgrimage", was published by National Geographic in October 1956.

Montreal and later years
Tata immigrated to Canada in 1956 and settled in Montreal. He quickly found work doing stills for documentary films made at the National Film Board, and he became a photo editor for The Montrealer magazine. His work appeared in publications and magazines such as Macleans, Perspectives, Chatelaine, and Time. Sometimes on assignment, but increasingly on his own initiative, he began to amass a portfolio of Canadian literary and artistic figures, including Michel Tremblay, Leonard Cohen, Michael Laucke, Irving Layton, George Bowering, Donald Sutherland, Alice Munro, and Gilles Vigneault. Tata preferred to take pictures with a 35mm camera and use the available light in the homes of his subjects, where they would feel more at ease and their personalities be more fully evoked by posing amidst their personal possessions.  In 1988, a major retrospective of his life and work, The Tata Era / L’Epoque Tata was mounted by the Canadian Museum of Contemporary Photography and toured the country. He received the Canada Council's Victor Martyn Lynch-Staunton Award (1982) and was made a member of the Royal Canadian Academy of Arts, In 1990 he was awarded the lifetime achievement award in 1990 from the Canadian Association of Professional Image Creators (CAPIC). In 1991, forty of his photographs appeared in the National Library of Canada exhibition, Canadian Writers at the National Library of Canada. Books devoted to his photography include Montreal (with Frank Lowe, 1963), Expo 67: Sculpture (1967), A Certain Identity: 50 Portraits (1983), Shanghai 1949: The End of an Era (1989), Portraits of Canadian Writers (1991), and India: Land of My Fathers (2005). Tata died July 3, 2005 at the age of 93 in Sooke, British Columbia, Canada.

On April 8, 2015, Canada Post issued a permanent domestic stamp with a photograph entitled Angels, Saint-Jean-Baptiste Day, taken in Montreal by Tata in 1962.

Selected solo exhibitions
Portraits of Canadian Writers, National Library of Canada, Ottawa, 1991
The Tata Era/ L’Époque Tata, The Canadian Museum of Contemporary Photography, Ottawa, 1988
Shanghai 1949: Photographs by Sam Tata, National Gallery of Canada, Ottawa, 1981
A Certain Identity, Centaur Gallery of Photography, Montreal, 1974
Sam Tata: 30 Photographs, Perception Gallery, Montreal, 1971
Photographs of Asia, George Eastman House, Rochester, New York, 1958
Photographs by Sam Tata, Royal Ontario Museum, Toronto, 1957

Selected group exhibitions
It’s All Happening So Fast: A Counter-History of the Modern Canadian Environment, Art Museum of the University of Toronto, 2017
Photography in Canada, National Gallery of Canada, 2017
Tendances actuelles au Québec: la photographie, Musée d'art contemporain, Montreal, 1979
La Fête, Rencontres internationales de la photograhie, Arles, France, 1978
The Magic World of Childhood, National Film Board Photo Gallery, Ottawa, 1971
Three Canadian Photographers: Guenter Karkutt — John Flanders — Sam Tata, National Film Board Photo Gallery, Ottawa, 1970
Photography at Mid-Century, George Eastman House, Rochester, New York, 1959
Seventh All-India Exhibition of Photography, Bombay, India, 1948Two-person show with Lang Jingshan'', Shanghai, 1946

Collections
National Gallery of Canada, Ottawa
Canadian Museum of Contemporary Photography, Ottawa
National Portrait Gallery, London
Winnipeg Art Gallery
University of Toronto

Notes

References

External links
 
 
 
 Archives of Sam Tata (Sam Tata fonds, R11097) are held at Library and Archives Canada.
 A collection of photographs of Canadian writers by Sam Tata (Portraits of Canadian writers collection, R11839) are held at Library and Archives Canada

1911 births
2005 deaths
Artists from Shanghai
Canadian photographers
Photography in China
Photography in India
Street photographers
Parsi people
Members of the Royal Canadian Academy of Arts
Chinese photographers
Chinese emigrants to Canada